The Issyk inscription is a yet undeciphered text, found in 1969 on a silver bowl in Issyk kurgan in Kazakhstan, dated at approximately the 4th century BC. The context of the burial gifts indicates that it may belong to Saka tribes.

Description 
The Issyk inscription is not yet certainly deciphered, and is probably in a Scythian dialect, constituting one of very few autochthonous epigraphic traces of that language. János Harmatta, using the Kharoṣṭhī script, identified the language as a Khotanese Saka dialect spoken by the Kushans, tentatively translating:

Zaur Hasanov (2015) identifies the script as an ancient Turkic language, related or identical to the Orkhon-Yenisei script, and translates it as:

Comparing the two proposed translations, the ancient Turkic translation is markedly more coherent semantically, and contains a poetic expression of respect for the dead, which is considered significant as the Turks followed Tengrism, in which there is a cult of the ancestors; thus it may be deemed more appropriate as an inscription at a grave site, compared to the Khotanese translation which reads roughly like a food recipe.

Photos of the inscription

See also
Nestor's Cup and Duenos inscription for other ancient inscriptions on vessels that concern the vessel itself

References 

Undeciphered writing systems
Archaeology of Kazakhstan
Kurgans